Eschershausen-Stadtoldendorf is a Samtgemeinde ("collective municipality") in the district of Holzminden, in Lower Saxony, Germany. Its seat is in the town Stadtoldendorf. It was formed on 1 January 2011 by the merger of the former Samtgemeinden Eschershausen and Stadtoldendorf.

The Samtgemeinde Eschershausen-Stadtoldendorf consists of the following municipalities:

 Arholzen 
 Deensen
 Dielmissen 
 Eimen 
 Eschershausen
 Heinade 
 Holzen
 Lenne 
 Lüerdissen
 Stadtoldendorf
 Wangelnstedt

Samtgemeinden in Lower Saxony